Santilla Chingaipe is a Zambian-born Australian journalist, author and filmmaker. Her documentaries include Third Culture Kids and Our African Roots etc.. She has been a guest on Tomorrow Tonight and Q&A.

Background
Chingaipe is an African Australian who migrated to Australia at the age of ten. She currently lives in the Victorian city of Melbourne.  Her film making efforts include the documentary, Our African Roots. The documentary which she produced with director Tony Jackson was an MIPCOM Diversify TV Award winner in 2022.

In addition to being a film maker and author, she has been a full-time journalist for SBS Television. She spent ten years with SBS.  During that time she reported from various locations in the African continent where she interviewed some the most prominent African leaders. She eventually left her job with SBS to concentrate full time on film making.

In addition to English she speaks Bemba, Nyanja and Namwanga which are Zambian languages. She can also speak some Swahili.

She has had recognition at the Victorian African Community Awards and the Celebration of African Australians Awards. She is also a four-time finalist for the United Nations Association of Australia Media Peace Awards.

She has written for The Saturday Paper. Her articles include, "The rise of far-right Hindu nationalism in Australia" (August 20, 2022), "Farm activists face tougher laws" (July 27, 2019), "Black Rhinos teams lift a community" (February 18, 2023) etc.

She founded the annual program, Behind the Screens. Supported by VicScreen this program operates with a view to increasing the representation of those people who haven't been included in the Australian film industry in the past.

Film career
Chingaipe wrote and directed the 2017 documentary short, Black as Me.

She directed Third Culture Kids, an Arenamedia production. It is a documentary about six Australian artists from different backgrounds. It was produced by Kate Laurie and Chloe Brugale with Robert Connolly as the executive producer. It looks at things from their perspective such as what it means to belong, representation, racism and identity.

During the pandemic, she made The Dancer, a short documentary which featured performance artist Zelia Rose.

Her film Our African Roots premiered on SBS television in October, 2021. The film looks at a forgotten and neglected part of Australian history. There were ten convicts of African heritage among the 1788 arrivals. Some of the names of the forgotten and overlooked were John Randall, Billy Blue, John Martin, Fanny Finch, and John Joseph. In her investigations, Chingaipe talks with descendents of Fanny Finch in Castlemaine. What comes to light is the involvement of Fanny in the history of Victoria's gold rush era and her role in the right for women to vote.

Written work

Books
Her book, Black Convicts: How slavery shaped colonised Australia is due for release some time in the near future. According to the Simon & Schuster website, quoting Scribner Australia's publisher Ben Ball, "Santilla peels off another layer of the whitewashing of our history".

Appearances
 Tomorrow Tonight, Episode 5 "The App", Aired 28 November 2018.
 Q&A, Episode: The Ethics of Accountability, Broadcast Thu 8 Jul 2021.
 Q&A, Episode: "Power, Politics, and the Spectre of War", Broadcast Thu 17 Nov 2022.

Further reading
 Fashion Journal, July 29, 2021 - LIFE, How I Do It: Journalist, filmmaker and author Santilla Chingaipe on surrounding yourself with the right people by Izzy Wright

References

External links
 IMDb: Santilla Chingaipe
 Instagram: Santilla Chingaipe (santigrams)

Living people
Year of birth missing (living people)
Australian journalists
Australian women journalists
Australian filmmakers